The Wild Party is a 1956 American film noir crime film directed by Harry Horner and written by John McPartland. The film stars Anthony Quinn, Carol Ohmart, Arthur Franz, Jay Robinson, Kathryn Grant, Nehemiah Persoff, and Paul Stewart. The film was released on December 21, 1956 by United Artists.

Plot
A former football player, "Big Tom" Kupfen, despondent over his glory days being behind him, drinks and uses drugs with a coterie of sycophants that include a piano player called Kicks Johnson, a drifter named Gage Freeposter and a naive young woman known only as "Honey".

On a whim, the group decides to go after a wealthy socialite, Erica London, and rob her home. They end up taking Erica and her fiancée, naval officer Arthur Mitchell, captive at an amusement park, with dire consequences for all.

Cast
 Anthony Quinn as Tom Kupfen
 Carol Ohmart as Erica London
 Arthur Franz as Lt. Arthur Mitchell
 Jay Robinson as Gage Freeposter
 Kathryn Grant as Honey
 Nehemiah Persoff as Kicks Johnson
 Paul Stewart as Ben Davis
 Nestor Paiva as Branson
 Maureen Stephenson as Ellen
 Michael Ross as Bouncer
 James Bronte as Bartender
 William Phipps as Wino
 Barbara Nichols as Sandy

References

External links
 
 
 
 

1956 films
Film noir
1956 crime films
American black-and-white films
American crime films
Films directed by Harry Horner
Films set in amusement parks
Films about hostage takings
United Artists films
1950s English-language films
1950s American films